Robert G. Bailey (born 1939) is an American geographer.  In the mid-1990s the US Forest Service adapted the Bailey hierarchy of ecological units for use as the scientific framework for ecosystem management of the national forests.

Bailey has a PhD in geography from the University of California, Los Angeles.

References

Living people
1939 births
American geographers
University of California, Los Angeles alumni